Nadine Michaela Gill (born 19 April 1991) is a German professional racing cyclist, who currently rides for UCI Women's Continental Team .

Major results
2022
 8th Grand Prix Féminin de Chambéry

References

External links
 

1991 births
Living people
German female cyclists
Sportspeople from Heidelberg